Matthew James Pini, also known as Matt Pini (born 21 March 1969 in Canberra), is an Australian-born Italian naturalized rugby union player. He played as a fullback.

Pini played for Wests Bulldogs, from 1990/91 to 1995/96. He moved to Richmond, England, where he played one season, in 1997/98. He spent the next season at RC Narbonne (1998/99). He had then his only season spent at Italy, representing Rugby Roma Olimpic (1999/2000). Moving to Newport, he would play there from 2000/01 to 2002/03.

Pini was one of the few players to compete at the Rugby World Cup for two countries, Australia and Italy. He had 8 caps for the "Wallabies", from 1994 to 1995, scoring 2 tries, 10 points in aggregate. He played 2 games at the 1995 Rugby World Cup.
He adopted Italian citizenship, due to his Italian ancestry, which allowed him to represent Italy. He had 12 caps for his new country, scoring 2 tries, 10 points in aggregate, from 1998 to 2000. He played at the 1999 Rugby World Cup, being used in 3 games. He also played 4 games at the 2000 Six Nations Championship. He renounced the National Team the same year.

He is head coach of Gallopers Old Boys, in Ashgrove, a team from the Queensland Premiership, in Australia, since 2007/08.

References

External links

1969 births
Australian rugby union players
Australian expatriate sportspeople in England
Australia international rugby union players
Australian rugby union coaches
Italian rugby union players
Italy international rugby union players
Italian rugby union coaches
Italian expatriate sportspeople in England
Rugby union fullbacks
Living people
Richmond F.C. players
Rugby union players from Canberra